The 2022 season was Sarawak United's third year in their history and first season in the Malaysia Super League since last year following rebranding from Selangor United FC. Along with the league, the club will also compete in the Malaysia Cup.

Players

Squad statistics

Appearances and goals

|-
|colspan="16"|Goalkeepers:
|-

|-
|colspan="16"|Defenders:
|-

|-
|colspan="16"|Midfielders:
|-

|-
|colspan="16"|Forwards:
|-

|-
|colspan="16"|Players that have left the club:

|-

References

Sarawak United FC seasons
Sarawak